Mike da Fonte (born 18 April 1991) is an American professional soccer player who plays as a defender.

Career

Youth and college
Mike da Fonte played his youth soccer with JBS FC a soccer club that was based out of Westchester County, New York.  Following his youth career
da Fonte played for Bryant University in 2009 before transferring to Longwood University for the 2010 season.  In 2011, he transferred again, this time to the University of Rio Grande, where he concluded his college soccer career.

During his college career, he also played with the Westchester Flames of the Premier Development League during the 2012 season.  He played as a left back for Westchester appearing in 9 matches and scoring 2 goals.

Professional
In 2012, da Fonte went on trial with Portuguese First Division club S.C. Olhanense, however due to the club's financial problems they were unable to sign him. However, he was signed by  S.C. Espinho of the Portuguese Second Division. In his first year in Portugal, da Fonte became a starter for the club and appeared in 23 league matches scoring 1 goal. He scored his lone goal of the season on January 20, 2013 in a 1–1 draw with UD Sousense. For the 2013/14 season da Fonte signed for Juventude de Pedras Salgadas and made 23 league appearances for the club.

da Fonte returned to the United States and signed with New York Red Bulls II for the 2015 season. He made his debut as a starter in the club's inaugural match, a 0–0 draw with the Rochester Rhinos. da Fonte was named to the USL Team of the Week for his performance in a 1-0 victory over Wilmington Hammerheads on June 13, 2015.

da Fonte moved across USL to Sacramento Republic FC for the 2016 season.

He signed with the Colorado Rapids early in the 2017 season. On February 10, 2018, da Fonte joined the Phoenix Rising FC on loan for the 2018 season.

da Fonte was released by Colorado at the end of their 2018 season.

da Fonte signed with OKC Energy FC on March 28, 2019. He was released at the end of the 2019 season, but re-signed with the club on September 2, 2020 for the remainder of the season.

Personal life
Da Fonte is of Portuguese descent through his father.

References

External links 

newyorkredbulls.com profile

1991 births
Living people
American soccer players
American people of Portuguese descent
American expatriate soccer players
Westchester Flames players
S.C. Espinho players
Juventude de Pedras Salgadas players
New York Red Bulls II players
Sacramento Republic FC players
Colorado Rapids players
People from Ossining, New York
Phoenix Rising FC players
OKC Energy FC players
Association football defenders
Soccer players from New York (state)
Sportspeople from Westchester County, New York
Expatriate footballers in Portugal
USL League Two players
Major League Soccer players
USL Championship players
Bryant Bulldogs men's soccer players
Longwood Lancers men's soccer players
Rio Grande RedStorm men's soccer players